Anita Denise Baker (born January 26, 1958) is an American singer-songwriter. 

She is one of the most popular singers of soulful ballads, especially renowned for her work during the height of the quiet storm period in the 1980s. Starting her career in the late 1970s with the funk band Chapter 8, Baker released her first solo album, The Songstress, in 1983. In 1986, she rose to stardom following the release of her Platinum-selling second album, Rapture, which included the Grammy-winning single "Sweet Love". , Baker has won eight Grammy Awards and has four Platinum albums, along with two Gold albums. Baker is a contralto with a range of nearly three octaves.

Life and music career

1958–79: Early life, career beginnings and Chapter 8
Anita Baker was born on January 26, 1958, in Toledo, Ohio. When she was two, her mother abandoned her and Baker was raised by a foster family in Detroit, Michigan. 
When Baker was 12, her foster parents died and her foster sister raised her afterwards. By the time Baker was 16, she began singing R&B at Detroit nightclubs. After one performance, she was discovered by bandleader David Washington, who gave her a card to audition for the funk band, Chapter 8.

Baker joined Chapter 8 in 1975 and the group toured until securing a deal with Ariola Records in 1979. The group's first album, Chapter 8, was released that year and featured the singles "Ready for Your Love", a duet between Baker and bandmate Gerald Lyles, and the Baker-led "I Just Want to Be Your Girl." After Ariola was bought out by Arista Records in 1979, Chapter 8 was dropped by the label who were convinced that Baker, as the group's lead singer, didn't have "star potential." Baker returned to Detroit, working as a waitress and a receptionist until, in 1982, Otis Smith, a former associate of Ariola, convinced Baker to start a solo career under his Beverly Glen label.

1983–89: The Songstress, Rapture and Giving You the Best That I Got

Baker released her debut solo album, The Songstress, in May 1983. The album produced four singles: "No More Tears" and its B-side, "Will You Be Mine", "Angel" and "You're the Best Thing Yet". "Angel" became Baker's first top ten single, reaching number five on the R&B charts in late 1983. "You're the Best Thing Yet" followed it in the R&B top 40 early the following year.

Despite this early success, Baker later complained that she hadn't received any royalties from the work. In addition, the label delayed work on Baker's follow-up of The Songstress. By 1984, after two years, Baker sought to leave the label but was sued by Smith for breach of contract in 1985. After months in court debating the matter, it was concluded that Baker should be allowed to record for other labels, winning the case against Beverly Glen label owner Otis Smith. Baker then signed with the Warner Music Group-associated Elektra Records label in 1985 and began working on her next album. Her Elektra contract allowed the singer to have creative control and produce her own music.

Baker used her old Chapter 8 bandmate, songwriter and producer Michael J. Powell on her first Elektra album, though label execs were initially unhappy with her choice of Powell over more established producers.

In March 1986, Baker released her second album, Rapture. While sales were initially slow following the release of the album's debut single, "Watch Your Step", Elektra released the mid-tempo ballad, "Sweet Love", which became her first pop hit, reaching number eight on the Billboard Hot 100 and also reaching the UK Top 20. The album eventually launched three further hit singles, including "Caught Up in the Rapture", "No One in the World" and "Same Ole Love (365 Days a Year)".

Throughout 1986 and 1987, Baker promoted the album by touring, headlining her first tour, The Rapture Tour, a show from which was later released on home video as A Night of Rapture. By 1988, the album had sold over 8 million copies worldwide, 5 million of which were sold in the United States alone. The album resulted in Baker's winning two Grammy Awards at the 1987 ceremony.

In 1987, Baker collaborated with The Winans on their song, "Ain't No Need to Worry", which gave Baker a third Grammy, this time in the Best Soul Gospel Performance by a Duo or Group, Choir or Chorus category.

Baker's follow-up album, Giving You the Best That I Got, was released in October 1988 and immediately became a success, topping the Billboard 200 and selling 5 million copies worldwide, 3 million of which sold alone in the United States. The title track reached number three on the Billboard Hot 100 and topped the R&B and adult contemporary charts, becoming her most successful charted single. The follow-up, "Just Because", reached the top 20 on the pop chart while also becoming an R&B chart-topper, while a third single, "Lead Me Into Love", became a top ten R&B hit. The album resulted in three more Grammy Awards for the singer.

1990–96: Compositions, motherhood, Rhythm of Love and tour
In 1990, Baker released Compositions, which had Baker more involved in the songwriting and production process and the first in which she began incorporating more jazz elements than in previous albums. The album launched the singles "Talk to Me", "Soul Inspiration" and "Fairy Tales", and eventually sold over a million copies.

After the end of the album's touring and promotion schedule in 1991, Baker took a break from the business to settle down with her husband at the time, later having two children with him. Meanwhile, Elektra bought the rights to, and reissued, her first album, The Songstress. It has since sold more than 300,000 copies.

After appearing on Frank Sinatra's Duets album, Baker returned to the charts with Rhythm of Love in 1994. The album featured "Body and Soul", her first top 40 pop hit since 1989. The second single, the mid-tempo "I Apologize", won Baker an eighth Grammy. The album eventually sold over two million copies: her fourth consecutive platinum-selling album. Baker undertook the Rhythm of Love World Tour from December 14, 1994 to November 14, 1995. Baker was transferred to another label within the Warner Music Group, Atlantic Records, in 1996.

Taking a hiatus after the end of the Rhythm of Love Tour to care for her two sons, Baker returned to the studio in 2000. In May 2001, she filed a lawsuit against Zomba Recording and its Dreamhire division for alleged damage to her recordings by a hired 24-track tape machine. Due to a label restructuring, Baker was let go from Atlantic that November without releasing any material with the company. 
During this hiatus, Rhino Records released the compilation, The Best of Anita Baker (named Sweet Love: The Very Best of Anita Baker in the UK) in June 2002. The album eventually was certified platinum by the RIAA, denoting sales in excess of 1,000,000 units in the US.

2004–08:  My Everything, Christmas Fantasy and tour
That year, Baker returned to live performing, signing with Blue Note Records in March 2004. That September, Baker released the album, My Everything. The album peaked at number four on the Billboard 200 and number-one on the R&B charts, eventually being certified gold.

In 2005, Baker released Christmas Fantasy, winning a Grammy nomination for the song, "Christmas Time Is Here". In May 2005, Baker was awarded an Honorary Doctorate of Music from Berklee College of Music. Starting in 2007, Baker embarked on a two-year concert tour titled An Evening with Anita Baker. She occasionally sang the American national anthem at sports events. 
"I met Anita at the Grammy Awards in 2007," said Mary J. Blige. "I told [her] how much she meant to me. She said, 'I'm glad that you picked up the ball where I left off.' That meant a lot."

2010–present: New music, tour, brief retirement, and comeback
Baker had been working on a new album featuring the single, "Only Forever", since 2010. In August 2012, Baker released her version of Tyrese's hit, "Lately". The song made headlines for Baker after the song was played every hour, on the hour, throughout the day on urban adult contemporary radio, making her the first artist to make this kind of debut. Though Blue Note set release dates for the album in October and December 2012, Baker decided she still needed to work on the album, causing delays. The album never materialized.

In February 2013, Baker returned to the national spotlight, performing "Lately" and "Same Ole Love" on Jimmy Kimmel Live!. That same month, she appeared at the Grammys where "Lately" was nominated for a Grammy Award for Best R&B Performance. In January 2017, Baker confirmed she had retired. She emerged from retirement in 2018.

In March 2021, Baker entered into a conflict with Elektra Records over rights to her master recordings, which she claimed were supposed to return to her after the expiration of her contract, according to copyright law. She asked fans to stop buying and streaming her music until the rights to her music were given to her. In September 2021, she announced that the dispute had been settled and that she owned her masters.

Baker performed "The Star-Spangled Banner" at Philadelphia's Lincoln Financial Field prior to the 2022 NFC Championship Game between the Eagles and San Francisco 49ers.

Personal life
Baker married Walter Bridgforth, Jr. on December 24, 1988. The couple separated in 2005 and finalized their divorce two years later. They have two sons, Walter Baker Bridgforth (born January 1993) and Edward Carlton Bridgforth (born May 1994). Baker currently lives in Grosse Pointe Park, Michigan.

More than five years after her divorce, Baker filed for a legal name change from Bridgforth to Baker in her private life.

Baker publicly endorsed presidential candidate Andrew Yang in the 2020 Democratic presidential primary.

Discography

Studio albums
The Songstress (1983)
Rapture (1986)
Giving You the Best That I Got (1988)
Compositions (1990)
Rhythm of Love (1994)
My Everything (2004)

Tours
The Rapture Tour (1986–87)
Giving You the Best World Tour (1988–89)
Compositions World Tour (1990–91)
Rhythm of Love World Tour (1994–95)
Anita Live! (2002–04)
An Evening with Anita Baker (2007–09)
Anita Baker: Farewell Concert Series (2018-2019)
The Songstress Tour (2023)

Awards and honors
In 2013, Anita Baker was inducted into the Michigan Rock and Roll Legends Hall of Fame.

BET Awards
The BET Awards were established in 2001 by the Black Entertainment Television network to celebrate African Americans in music, acting, sports, and other fields of entertainment over the past year. The awards are presented annually, and are broadcast live on BET.

|-
|| 2018
|| Anita Baker
| Lifetime Achievement Award
| 
|-

Grammy Awards
The Grammy Awards are awarded annually by the National Academy of Recording Arts and Sciences. Baker has received eight awards from 18 nominations. 

|-
|rowspan="2"|  || Rapture || Best R&B Vocal Performance, Female || 
|-
| "Sweet Love" || Best Rhythm & Blues Song || 
|-
||  || "Ain't No Need to Worry" (with The Winans) || Best Soul Gospel Performance by a Duo, Group, Choir or Chorus || 
|-
|rowspan="4"| 
|rowspan="4"| "Giving You the Best That I Got" || Record of the Year || 
|-
| Song of the Year || 
|-
| Best R&B Vocal Performance, Female || 
|-
| Best Rhythm & Blues Song || 
|-
||  || Giving You the Best That I Got || Best R&B Vocal Performance, Female || 
|-
|rowspan="2"|  || Compositions || Best R&B Vocal Performance, Female || 
|-
| Compositions || Best Album Package || 
|-
|rowspan="2"|  || "Body and Soul" || Best Female R&B Vocal Performance || 
|-
| Rhythm of Love || Best R&B Album || 
|-
|rowspan="2"|  || "When You Love Someone" (with James Ingram) || Best Pop Collaboration with Vocals || 
|-
| "I Apologize" || Best Female R&B Vocal Performance || 
|-
|rowspan="2"|  || "You're My Everything" || Best Traditional R&B Vocal Performance || 
|-
| My Everything || Best R&B Album || 
|-
||  || "Christmas Time Is Here" || Best Traditional R&B Vocal Performance || 
|-
||  || "Lately" || Best Traditional R&B Performance || 
|-

American Music Awards
The American Music Awards is an annual awards ceremony created by Dick Clark in 1973.  Baker has received four awards from nine nominations.

|-
|rowspan="2"|  ||| Anita Baker || Favorite Soul/R&B Female Artist || 
|-
| Rapture || Favorite Soul/R&B Album || 
|-
|rowspan="2"|  ||| Anita Baker || Favorite Soul/R&B Female Artist || 
|-
| Rapture || Favorite Soul/R&B Album || 
|-
|rowspan="3"| 
|rowspan="2"|  Anita Baker
| Favorite Pop/Rock Female Artist || 
|-
| Favorite Soul/R&B Female Artist || 
|-
| "Just Because" || Favorite Soul/R&B Single || 
|-
||  ||| Anita Baker || Favorite Soul/R&B Female Artist || 
|-
||  ||| Anita Baker || Favorite Soul/R&B Female Artist || 
|-

Soul Train Music Awards
The Soul Train Music Awards is an annual award show aired in national broadcast syndication that honors the best in African American music and entertainment established in 1987.

|-
|rowspan="3"| 1987
|rowspan="2"| "Sweet Love"
| Best Single, Female
| 
|-
| Best Music Video
| 
|-
| Rapture || Album of the Year, Female
| 
|-
|rowspan="3"| 1989
|rowspan="2"| "Giving You the Best That I Got"
| Best R&B/Urban Contemporary Song of the Year
|  
|-
| Best R&B/Urban Contemporary Single, Female
|  
|-
| Giving You the Best That I Got || Best R&B/Urban Contemporary Album of the Year, Female
| 
|-
|rowspan="2"| 1991
| "Talk to Me" || Best R&B/Urban Contemporary Single, Female
| 
|-
| Compositions || Best R&B/Urban Contemporary Album of the Year, Female
| 
|-
|rowspan="3"| 1995
|rowspan="2"| "Body and Soul"
| Best R&B/Soul or Rap Music Video
| 
|-
| Best R&B/Soul Single, Female
| 
|-
| Rhythm of Love || R&B/Soul Album of the Year, Female
| 
|-
|| 2010
|| Anita Baker
| Legend Award, Female
| 
|-

Other honors

References

Sources:

External links

Anita Baker at SoulTracks

1958 births
African-American women singer-songwriters
American contraltos
American soul singers
Atlantic Records artists
Blue Note Records artists
Grammy Award winners
Living people
Musicians from Toledo, Ohio
American contemporary R&B singers
Smooth jazz singers
Ballad musicians
Singers from Detroit
20th-century African-American women singers
21st-century African-American women singers
Singer-songwriters from Michigan
Singer-songwriters from Ohio